Bubacarr Bah is a Gambian mathematician and chair of Data Science at the African Institute for Mathematical Sciences (AIMS). He is an assistant professor at Stellenbosch University and a member of the Google advanced technology external advisory council.

Early life and education 
Bah was born in The Gambia. He studied mathematics at the University of the Gambia and graduated summa cum laude in 2004. He was awarded a Master of Science (MSc) degree from the University of Oxford, where he studied mathematical modelling as a postgraduate student of Wolfson College, Oxford. He was a member of the Society for Industrial and Applied Mathematics (SIAM) student chapter. His work on Gaussian matrices was awarded the SIAM best student paper.

Research and career 
Between 2012 and 2014 Bah was a postdoctoral researcher at the École Polytechnique Fédérale de Lausanne, where he continued his investigations into compressed sensing. He was a member of the Laboratory for Information and Inference Systems.

In 2014 Bah joined the University of Texas at Austin, where he worked on signal processing, machine learning and sampling strategies in high-dimensional data. He developed a matrix for dimensionality reduction  that uses bi-Lipschitz embeddings, which can exploit data redundancy.

In 2016 Bah was appointed the German Chair in Mathematics at the African Institute for Mathematical Sciences (AIMS), which is supported by the Humboldt Foundation. The position was welcomed by the AIMS community, who believe Africa needs better data science infrastructure. Bah organised the software engineering for Applied Mathematical Sciences workshop, which teaches basic programming and research programming. He is responsible for connecting the AIMS in South Africa with central Africa and German universities. As of 2019, the Alexander von Humboldt Foundation support five chairs at AIMS centres. He holds a joint position at Stellenbosch University, where he works on information theory and deep learning.

In March 2019 Bah was appointed to the Google advanced technology external advisory council, a collection of experts who will consider the artificial intelligence (AI) principles of Google.

References 

Gambian mathematicians
Alumni of the University of Edinburgh
Alumni of the University of Oxford
Gambian academics
Living people
Academic staff of Stellenbosch University
Year of birth missing (living people)